The 1910–11 Yale Bulldogs men's ice hockey season was the 16th season of play for the program.

Season
For the second time in three years Yale finished the season 4 games below .500. They did, however, lose four games to undefeated intercollegiate champion Cornell.

The team did not have a coach, however, C. Lawson Reed served as team manager.

Roster

Standings

Schedule and Results

|-
!colspan=12 style="color:white; background:#00356B" | Regular Season

References

Yale Bulldogs men's ice hockey seasons
Yale
Yale
Yale
Yale